Frederik Christensen (born 7 March 1995) is a Danish professional footballer who plays as a forward for Danish 1st Division club Næstved Boldklub.

Club career

FC Vestsjælland
Christensen signed his first professional contract in May 2015. He was the first player in the history of FCV, who signed a professional contract, coming from the youth teams of the club.

On 7 June 2015, Christensen got his professional and Superliga debut for FCV, in a match against Silkeborg IF, where he was in the lineup, but was taken out in the 55nd minute.

BK Frem
At the end of June 2019, BK Frem announced that Christensen had joined the club from Slagelse B&I.

Return to Slagelse
On 26 July 2020, Christensen returned to Slagelse B&I.

Næstved
After a season in Slagelse, Christensen moved to Næstved Boldklub on 26 June 2021.

Statistics

References

External links
 Frederik Christensen on Soccerway

1995 births
Living people
Danish men's footballers
Association football forwards
FC Vestsjælland players
Boldklubben Frem players
Næstved Boldklub players
Danish Superliga players
Danish 1st Division players
Danish 2nd Division players
People from Slagelse
Sportspeople from Region Zealand